Denys Olegovich Sylantyev (born 3 October 1976) is a Ukrainian politician and retired swimmer. He competed at four consecutive Olympics between 1996 and 2008 and who won a silver medal in the 200 m butterfly in 2000. At the next Olympics he was the flag bearer for Ukraine.

He won the Mare Nostrum circuit three times: 2000, 2001 and 2002. In 1998 he was named European Swimmer of the Year.

Sylantyev retired from competitions shortly after the 2008 Olympics and focused on politics and development of sport in Ukraine.

In the 2012 Ukrainian parliamentary election, Silantyev was a self-nominated candidate in constituency No.217 situated in Kyiv's Obolon District but he did not win a parliamentary seat. He lost this election to Oleksandr Bryhynets of Batkivshchyna who gained 31.75% of the votes while Silantyev gained 5.18% and fourth place.

In the 26 October 2014 Ukrainian parliamentary election Sylantyev was as a candidate (placed 8th on the party list) of Radical Party was elected into the Ukrainian parliament. In the 2019 election he was placed 15th on the election list. But Radical Party lost all its parliamentary seats in the 2019 Ukrainian parliamentary election, because  it gained about 1% to little to clear the 5% election threshold and also did not win an electoral district seat.

In the 2020 Kyiv local election (set for 25 October 2020) Sylantyev is a candidate for the Kyiv City Council in Obolon District for For the Future.

References

External links

Personal website

1976 births
Living people
Sportspeople from Zaporizhzhia
Ukrainian male swimmers
Swimmers at the 1996 Summer Olympics
Swimmers at the 2000 Summer Olympics
Swimmers at the 2004 Summer Olympics
Male butterfly swimmers
Olympic swimmers of Ukraine
Olympic silver medalists for Ukraine
World Aquatics Championships medalists in swimming
Medalists at the FINA World Swimming Championships (25 m)
European Aquatics Championships medalists in swimming
Radical Party of Oleh Liashko politicians
Ukrainian sportsperson-politicians
Eighth convocation members of the Verkhovna Rada
Medalists at the 2000 Summer Olympics
Olympic silver medalists in swimming
Universiade medalists in swimming
Goodwill Games medalists in swimming
Universiade gold medalists for Ukraine
Medalists at the 1997 Summer Universiade
Competitors at the 1998 Goodwill Games
Recipients of the Honorary Diploma of the Cabinet of Ministers of Ukraine